is a professional Japanese baseball player. He plays pitcher for the Hiroshima Toyo Carp.

References 

1997 births
Living people
Baseball people from Kagawa Prefecture
Japanese baseball players
Nippon Professional Baseball pitchers
Hiroshima Toyo Carp players
People from Takamatsu, Kagawa